Handball SA (formerly Team Handball Association of South Australia, or THASA) is the administrative body for European handball in South Australia and is based in Adelaide.

Handball SA's primary purpose is to promote and develop team handball in South Australia, run junior and educational programs and administer team handball and beach handball competitions in the state. Handball SA is operated by a committee of volunteers whose current president is Tammie Hamilton.

THASA, as Handball SA was then known, was founded in 1987 and its first president was Dieter Schultz. The fortunes of the organization have been mixed since its inception. In the period 1992-2000 THASA oversaw a competition of 5 men's teams and 2 women's teams. Following this period, THASA was inactive for five years before it restarted in 2005 and is still in the process of rebuilding the handball competition in South Australia to the level of the previous decade. In 2010, THASA was officially renamed Handball SA.

Handball SA has sent both men's and women's teams to represent South Australia in the annual Australian Handball Federation National Championships on a sporadic basis since 1989. In the 2010 Championships the women's and men's teams placed 3rd and 6th respectively. Birte Biehler from South Australia was awarded joint Most Valuable Player in the women's division.

In 2011 the teams placed 4th and 6th respectively, and the women's team was presented with the Fair Play award. Lucas Turecek from the men's team was also declared the highest scorer of the Championships.

Handball SA hosted the 2012 Australian Handball Championships in Adelaide at Netball SA Stadium from 4 to 7 October 2012. It was the first time in two decades that the national championships have been held in Adelaide. Both SA men's and women's teams placed fourth, after 3 wins in the preliminary round for the former, and one win for the latter. Clemence Schmitt, pivot from South Australia, was awarded Most Valuable Player in the women's division.

In 2013 Handball SA again held the Australian Handball Championships, from 10 to 13 October at Netball SA Stadium - the second time in two years. The SA women's team returned to the medals, winning a silver medal against VIC in the final. The men finished with fourth, after going into extra time in the bronze medal match against QLD.

2016 was a very important year for the South Australian men's team. The team collected a silver medal at the Australian Open Club Championships in Geelong, and then earned its first-ever gold medal at the Australian Handball Championships.

Handball SA currently oversees an indoor handball competition. Over the past few years this has been contested by the two major South Australian clubs, Southern Handball Club and West Adelaide Handball Club. The season runs from approximately April to September.

ABC Adelaide featured handball in 2012 ('European handball gets a grip on sports fans in Adelaide'), while Behind The News ran a feature on handball in 2011 ('Handball').

Since 2008, Handball SA has also run a beach handball competition during the summer months on various beaches in Adelaide. The beach handball season runs from approximately October to March.

Handball SA hosted the Australian Beach Handball Championships in 2010, 2015, 2017 and 2018 at Glenelg, South Australia. It will do so again in 2019.

The men's team was able to gain a silver medal at the Australian Beach Handball Championships in 2016, and the women have won a bronze medal on more than one occasion.

ABC Radio's Grandstand picked up on the growing popularity of beach handball in Adelaide in 2012 ('Grandstand Sporting Adventures').

See also

Australian Handball Federation
Australian National Handball Championship

References

External links
Handball SA website

Handball in Australia
Sports governing bodies in South Australia